Zágráb may refer to:

 the Hungarian name for the city of Zagreb, Croatia
 Zagreb County (former), an administrative subdivision of the former Kingdom of Hungary